Krasimir Zafirov (born 20 May 1950 in Byala) is a retired Bulgarian football player and now coach of FC Chernomorets Byala.

Career
Zafirov was a goalkeeper. He played with Spartak Varna and earned 461 caps. For the Bulgaria national football team Zafirov featured in 3 games.

Awards
 The best goalkeeper in Bulgaria: 1984, 1986

References

External links
 History of Spartak 1918

1950 births
Living people
Bulgarian footballers
Bulgaria international footballers
PFC Velbazhd Kyustendil players
PFC Cherno More Varna players
PFC Spartak Varna players
First Professional Football League (Bulgaria) players
Association football goalkeepers
Bulgarian football managers
PFC Spartak Varna managers
Sportspeople from Varna, Bulgaria
People from Varna Province